Sing Brother Sing is the second album by English psychedelic rock band, Edgar Broughton Band. It was originally released as "Harvest SHVL 772" in June 1970. The 2004 CD reissue contains 8 bonus tracks.

There were no A-side singles released from this album, however "Momma's Reward (Keep Them Freak's a Rollin')" and "Officer Dan" were both featured as B-sides to "Out Demons Out" and "Up Yours" respectively. "Out Demons Out" charted as high as number 39 on the UK Official Charts.

Track listing

"There's No Vibrations, But Wait!" (Robert Edgar Broughton) – 4:10
"The Moth" – 5:11
"The Moth" (R. E. Broughton) – 1:45
"People" (R. E. Broughton, Steve Broughton, Arthur Grant) – 1:00
"Peter" (R. E. Broughton) – 2:26
"Momma's Reward (Keep Them Freak's a Rollin')" (R. E. Broughton) – 3:05
"Refugee" (R. E. Broughton) – 3:29
"Officer Dan" (S. Broughton) – 1:36
"Old Gopher" (S. Broughton) – 3:50
"Aphrodite" (R. E. Broughton) – 4:04
"Granma" (R. E. Broughton) – 2:24
"Psychopath" – 6:45
"The Psychopath" (R. E. Broughton) – 2:17
"Is for Butterflies" (S. Broughton, A. Grant) – 4:28
"It's Falling Away" (R. E. Broughton) – 5:30

2004 CD reissue bonus tracks
"Out Demons Out" (Grant, R.E. Broughton, S. Broughton) – 4:47 (Released as A-side of "Harvest HAR 5015")
"Rag Doll" (Grant, R.E. Broughton, S. Broughton) – 5:29 (Previously unreleased)
"There's No Vibrations, But Wait!" (R. E. Broughton) – 4:12 (Alternate version previously unreleased)
"The Locket" (R. E. Broughton) – 5:58 (Previously unreleased)
"We've Got the Power" (Grant, R.E. Broughton, S. Broughton) – 6:27 (Previously unreleased)
"Up Yours" (R. E. Broughton) – 3:00 (Released as A-side of "Harvest HAR 5021")
"Freedom" (R. E. Broughton) – 3:12 (Released as B-side of "Harvest HAR 5032")
"Apache Dropout" (Don Van Vliet, Jerry Lordan) – 3:02 (Previously unreleased Peter Jenner version)

Personnel

Edgar Broughton Band
 Edgar Broughton – vocals, guitar
 Arthur Grant – bass guitar, vocals
 Steve Broughton – drums

Technical
 Peter Jenner – producer
 Peter Mew – engineer
 Andy "Drop-in" Stephens – assistant engineer
 Neil Richmond – assistant engineer
 Edgar Broughton – artwork (inside drawings)
 Derick Carter – photography
 Lothar Schiffler – photography

References

1970 albums
Edgar Broughton Band albums
Albums produced by Peter Jenner
Harvest Records albums